The Great Chagos Bank, in the Chagos Archipelago, about  south of Maldives, is the largest atoll structure in the world, with a total area of .  The atoll is administered by the United Kingdom through the British Indian Ocean Territory (BIOT).

Islands
Despite its enormous size, the Great Chagos Bank is largely a submarine structure. There are only four emerging reefs, mostly located on the western rim of the atoll, except for lonely Nelson Island, which lies wholly isolated in the middle of the northern fringe. All islands and their surrounding waters are a Strict Nature Reserve since 1998. The total length of the eastern and southern expanses of the bank, as well as the reefs in its central area are wholly submerged.

The islands of the Great Chagos Bank, starting clockwise from the south, are:

Eagle Islands
Île Aigle (Eagle Island, vegetated with high coconut trees, land area 
Sea Cow Island (Île Vache Marine), vegetated with trees, land area .
Three Brothers (Trois Frères) and Resurgent Islands, vegetated with high coconut trees, land area . 
Île du Sud (South Island, largest of the group), 
Île du Milieu (Middle Island), 
Resurgent Island (unvegetated), 
Île du Nord (North Island), 

Cartography of the submerged reefs
The Great Chagos Bank was surveyed for the first time by Commander Robert Moresby of the Indian Navy in 1837; all other maps that would be drawn for over a century and a half were based on his chart. Although the charts of atolls made up of mostly emerged reefs, like Peros Banhos and Diego Garcia, were relatively accurate, the cartography of the vast sunken reefs forming the Great Chagos Bank proved quite a challenge. The real shape of these sunken reefs was known only when satellite imagery became available in the latter part of the 20th century.

Moresby's original hydrographic drawings were somewhat at variance with the true shape of the submerged reef, especially in areas where there were no emerging islands close by, like in the South east of the bank. The outlines of the first hydrographic surveys were marked in the 1980s navigational maps of the Chagos with a dotted line and the legend "existence doubtful" until the 1998 edition.

See also
 Chagos Archipelago
 Chagos Marine Protected Area
 Diego Garcia

References

External links

Geochronology of Basement Rocks from the Mascarene Plateau, the Chagos Bank and the Maldives Ridge

Atolls of the Chagos Archipelago
Nature reserves
Undersea banks of the Indian Ocean
Reefs of the Indian Ocean